Jana Nečasová, formerly Nagyová (born July 21, 1964) is a former Czech politician and civil servant. 

Nagyová was arrested at the onset of the major 2013 Czech political corruption scandal, a part of which is known as Nagyová's Case. Her case involves three separate cases. The major one was finalized in 2019, when, after passing via the Court of Appeals, she together with a number of  other functionaries, was found guilty (with suspended sentence) of tasking the leadership of Military Intelligence to spy on the then Prime Minister Petr Nečas's wife Radka to facilitate Nečas's divorce. Nagyová was Nečas's mistress at that time.

On 20 January 2023 Czech president Miloš Zeman has granted a presidential pardon to Nečasová in case of Military Intelligence.

References

1964 births
Living people
Czech politicians
Corruption in the Czech Republic

cs:Kauza Nagyová